The Arm, palm down or cubit hieroglyph (Gardiner D42) has the phonetic value mḥ. A variant with the upper arm "slanted" is D41.
It represents the Egyptian cubit (about 20 inches).

See also

Gardiner's Sign List#D. Parts of the Human Body
List of Egyptian hieroglyphs
Ancient Egyptian units of measurement#Length

References

Budge, (1920), 1978.  An Egyptian Hieroglyphic Dictionary, p. 316a.

Egyptian hieroglyphs: parts of the human body